Anton Olegovich Usov (born 12 May 1994) is a former Russian professional football player.

Club career
He made his Russian Football National League debut for FC Torpedo Vladimir on 4 November 2011 in a game against FC Baltika Kaliningrad.

External links
 
 
  Career profile at sportbox.ru

1994 births
People from Vladimir, Russia
Living people
Russian footballers
Association football defenders
FC Torpedo Vladimir players
FC Volga Ulyanovsk players
Sportspeople from Vladimir Oblast